Nic Beveridge (born 14 July 1986) is an elite Australian triathlete with a disability. He represented Australia at the 2016 Rio Paralympics when Triathlon made its debut at the Games and 2020 Tokyo Paralympics. He represented Australia at the 2018 Gold Coast Commonwealth Games where he won a silver medal.

Personal
Beveridge was born on 14 July 1986 in Gold Coast, Queensland. He grew up in Mackay and was an avid sports fan taking part in cross county, swimming, water polo and hockey before waking up in 2003 at the age of 17 to discover he was completely paralysed from the chest down. He was later diagnosed with transverse myelitis, a neurological disorder causing inflammation to his spinal cord.

Career
In 2012 after a short stay in hospital, Beveridge fell in love with paralympic sport. This led to Beveridge choosing to take up paratriathlon. Beveridge competes in the PTWC (handcycle/racing wheelchair classification). He first started competing in 2013 making his international debut at the 2013 ITU World Championships in London finishing 17th in the Men's PT1. Competing at the  2014 ITU World Championship Grand Final in Edmonton he finished 9th in the Men's PT1. At the 2015 ITU World Championship Grand Final in Chicago he finished 9th in the Men's PT1.  At the 2016 Rotterdam ITU Paratriathlon World Championships in Rotterdam, he finished 11th in the Men's PT1.

Beveridge is able to compete in triathlon by swimming using his upper body, riding with a recumbent handcycle and completing the run through the use of a racing wheelchair.

Beveridge competed at the 2016 Rio Paralympics Games and placed ninth in Men's PT1 event. Beveridge reflected on his performance in Rio throughout saying "It was the fittest I've ever been and I was happy with how it went."

At the 2017 ITU World Championships in Rotterdam, Beveridge finished fourth in the Men's PTWC. It was his best ever international performance.  Beveridge won the silver medal in the Men's PTWC at the 2018 Commonwealth Games. At the 2019 ITU World Triathlon Grand Final in Lausanne, he finished ninth in the Men's PTWC.

At the 2020 Tokyo Paralympics, Beveridge he finished seventh in Men's PTWC with a Total Time of 1:04.50.

Recognition 

 2019 - Triathlon Australia Male Para-triathlon Performance of the Year 
 2021 - Triathlon Australia Male Para-triathlon Performance of the Year

References

External links
 
 
 
 
 

1986 births
Living people
Australian male triathletes
Paratriathletes of Australia
Paratriathletes at the 2016 Summer Paralympics
Paratriathletes at the 2020 Summer Paralympics
Commonwealth Games medallists in triathlon
Commonwealth Games silver medallists for Australia
Triathletes at the 2018 Commonwealth Games
ACT Academy of Sport alumni
20th-century Australian people
21st-century Australian people
Medallists at the 2018 Commonwealth Games